Battle of Mared (Slaget vid Mared) was a battle during the Nordic Seven Years' War between the Swedish and Danish forces on 9 November 1563. The battle was held on the site of present-day locality Oskarström in Sweden.

After the outbreak of the war, a Swedish army under the command of King Eric XIV marched into Halland. The goal was to besiege Halmstad, but it failed because of the lack of artillery. Since King Frederick II of Denmark and Norway was on his way with reinforcements, the Swedes pulled back. But they were caught up in Mared on the border between Halland and Småland, where they were defeated.

The Danes were victorious, but there was no decisive victory, as the Swedes managed to pull back.

References

External links 
Battle of Mared, 9 November 1563 (HistoryofWar.org)

Battles involving Sweden
Battles involving Denmark
Battles of the Northern Seven Years' War
Conflicts in 1563
1563 in Denmark